Cannington Priory was a Benedictine nunnery established around 1138 and dissolved in 1536 in Cannington, Somerset, England.

It was attached to the Church of St Mary.

It was first populated by Benedictine nuns (from Dorset), who were later transferred to Colwich Abbey. The building was converted into a mansion but later reverted to being a nunnery. It was disestablished as part of the Dissolution of the Monasteries in 1536.

Cannington Court incorporates some of the remains.

References

Monasteries in Somerset
1138 establishments in England
1536 disestablishments in England
Benedictine nunneries in England
Christian monasteries established in the 12th century